Para Hills is a residential suburb of Adelaide, South Australia. There is a light aircraft airport close to its boundary, and numerous sporting facilities, abundant parks and schools and two medium-sized shopping centres. Most of the suburb is in the City of Salisbury while some is in the City of Tea Tree Gully.

History

An early settler family were the Goodalls, who established a farm at the base of the hills in 1850. When Andrew Melville Goodall expanded the farm in 1853 he named the property Para Hills Farm, building a farmhouse near what is now the corner of St Clair Avenue and Goodall Road.

Para Hills Post Office opened on 28 June 1961.

Landscape

Geology
The formation of this escarpment has led to short, steep-sided gullies which are characteristic of Para Hills. The gullies are usually dry, running only shortly after rain, and have mostly been left as public parks. Outcrops of exposed pre-Cambrian rocks have been quarried for use in roadmaking and construction since the late 19th century. The outcrops within Para Hills are not extensive and only one quarry operated in the suburb's residential area.

Flora

Prior to subdivision there is very little recorded about the vegetation of the hills. What records exist report that the plains where mostly covered in kangaroo grass, with the hills being lightly covered in Eucalyptus Porosa (Mallee box), Acacia paradoxa (Kangaroo thorn wattle) and Acacia pyncantha (Golden Wattle). Public parks in para hills are now landscaped with Australian native vegetation. Most of the streets show Salisbury council's practice of lining roadsides with Eucalypts, Acacias and other Australian native trees.

Geography
The boundary of Para Hills is defined by McIntyre Road and the Para Hills reserve to the north, Kelly Road to the east, Bridge Road to the west, and Maxwell Road and Milne Road to the south. The northern boundary moved south from Wynn Vale Drive in 2002 when Gulfview Heights was declared.

History

The area was originally inhabited by the Kaurna tribe of Indigenous Australians. By the time the area was settled by Europeans in the 1840s, introduced diseases such as smallpox had already spread from the eastern states and decimated the population.

Land grants in the Para Hills area began in 1847. Notable farming families first settling the area were the Goodalls (on 12 August 1850), the Kesters (1893), and the MacIntyres (1865). From settlement as distant farming land, to subdivision for residential development, the land increased greatly in value. The land was valued at £4.10 per acre in 1900, £16 in 1937, £420 and £1200 for some of the flatter land shortly after its subdivision.

Farming and quarrying continued, as the sole activities on the land, until Reid Murray Developments (R.M.D.) began acquiring land for subdivision in 1959. The development was, at the time, the largest private housing development in Australia and had a budget of £6 million. R.M.D. was not the only developer active in the suburb with most of the Goodall and McIntyre farmland being sold to, or subdivided by, other companies. In total R.M.D. purchased . R.M.D. copied a new concept from the South Australian Housing Trust's new development at Elizabeth, constructing the suburb as a self-contained neighbourhood from the outset. Unusually fifteen percent of the land was set aside for parks, arrangements were made with Woolworths (S.A.) Ltd to provide a supermarket, and with the State government for the speedy provision of a post office and school. R.M.D. did not sell any vacant land, but only complete house, land and some furnishings packages (prices ranging from £4,000 to £5,500). The houses all had three or more bedrooms, flat corrugated iron or angled tile roofs, and were constructed from bricks, modular concrete blocks or Mount Gambier freestone.

R.M.D. set up offices in London to attract new British migrants prior to their trip to Australia. Salesmen met new immigrants at Fremantle dock. Flats were built in Barcoo Street to temporarily house intending purchasers, many of whom were travelling under assisted passage. Some settlers were not prepared for the frontier conditions they met, with no amenities or trees, and surroundings of little more than open paddocks. Many of the migrants came from established cities, and expressed dismay at the prospect of having to form a community from scratch. A vendor finance scheme was begun allowing a some newlyweds to purchase homes with a deposit as low as £500. An extensive marketing effort to sell the homes included, a home donated to the crippled children's association, subsidised bus services, free use of the olympic size swimming pool for residents, twenty-five furnished display homes and £10,000 of Television advertising.

The suburb developed quickly, fifty-five homes completed in the first six months and seventy under construction, along with sealed roads, storm water and sewerage services and gas and electricity supply. All three original farming families have main roads in Para Hills named after them. The farmhouse of Allen Kesters (built in 1934) is still in use, on the corner of Kesters and Bridge roads as a real-estate office, and the McIntyre farmhouse was, as of 1985, occupied by the McIntyre family.

Timeline

 29 October 1846, Hundred of Yatala proclaimed and area divided into sections.
 July 1847, First land grants acquired.
 1850, Goodall family acquire a land grant and begin farming.
 1852, McIntyre family begin leasing farming land.
 1893, Kesters family acquire land and establish a farm.
 1911, First (two-inch) water main laid down Kesters Road.
 1934, Allen Kester's house built on the corner of Kesters and Bridge Road.
 1950's (year unknown), Electricity supply begun after formation of the Electricity Trust of South Australia.
 1959, All Kesters family land purchased by R.M.D.
 25 February 1960, Construction of first house begun with pouring of the concrete foundation.
 2 August 1960, Premier Sir Thomas Playford officially opens the new housing estate.
 February 1961, First school lessons begin in pre-fabricated classrooms in the site of current day Para Hills Primary School.
 March 1961, 100th family arrives in the Para Hills estate.
 27 June 1961, First scouting meeting with the formation of a cub pack.
 24 February 1962, 1/2 Olympic size swimming pool and community hall opened.
 September 1963, Presbyterian Church on the corner of Barcoo Streets and Liberman roads begins services.
 12 September 1963, Shopping centre opens on Wilkinson Road.
 1964, Goodall farm including Para Hills farm purchased by R.M.D.
 1964, Para Hills Farm's farmhouse demolished to make way for subdivision.
 17 June 1968, First Para Hills library opened by Premier Steele Hall.
 27 April 1972, Para Hills police station opens
 1976, Population reaches 11,213.

The suburb of Para Hills also has a school R-7, and was made in 1961 so it is over 47 years old. The school is on Francis Ave.

Trivia
Para Hills was used to showcase an 'expandable house' that allowed for rooms to be added in four stages. The house was part of the Housing Trust of South Australia's demonstration village opened in 1982.

Transport
The suburb is accessible from Adelaide by bus, (partly using Adelaide's O-Bahn Busway). A train station is approximately 2 kilometres to the west.

Public transport began in 1961 with a once-daily, privately run return bus service to Adelaide. The service was run by "Lewis Brothers", initially with a £60 weekly subsidy from Reid Murray Developments. By 1974, when the Municipal Tramways Trust took over all buses and services in Para Hills, it had expanded to 44 buses and numerous routes.

Bus routes in Para Hills provide connections to Elizabeth Shopping Centre, Lyell McEwin Hospital, Royal Adelaide Hospital, Women's and Children's Hospital and Westfield Tea Tree Plaza

References

See also
 List of Adelaide suburbs

Suburbs of Adelaide